Haementeria is a genus of leeches in the family Glossiphoniidae. The genus was described in 1849 by Filippo De Filippi.

It has been found in Europe and America.

Species
Species include:
 Haementeria ghilianii de Filippi, 1849
 Haementeria officinalis de Filippi, 1849
 Haementeria tuberculifera (Grube, 1871)

References

Leeches
Annelid genera
Taxa named by Filippo De Filippi